Ashby Apartments, also known as Gooch Apartments and Suzanne Apartments, is a historic building in Salt Lake City, Utah. It was built in 1925-1926 for the Bowers Investment Company, and designed in the Mission Revival style. It was acquired by the Eflow Investment Company in 1926. From 1936 to 1963, it belonged to  Ralph A. Badger, who owned and managed five apartment buildings in Salt Lake City, and who served as the president of the Apartment House Association of Utah. The building has been listed on the National Register of Historic Places since November 16, 2006.

References

National Register of Historic Places in Salt Lake City
Mission Revival architecture in Utah
Residential buildings completed in 1925
1925 establishments in Utah